Kaiky Fernandes Melo (born 12 January 2004), simply known as Kaiky, is a Brazilian footballer who plays as a centre-back for La Liga club Almería.

Club career

Santos
Born in Santos, São Paulo, Kaiky joined Santos' youth setup from local side Portuários. Initially playing futsal, he started to appear in the club's football categories at the age of nine.

On 21 December 2020, Kaiky signed his first professional contract with Peixe, agreeing to a three-year deal. He made his professional debut the following 28 February, starting in a 2–2 Campeonato Paulista away draw against Santo André.

On his Copa Libertadores debut on 9 March 2021, Kaiky started and scored his first professional goal, netting the winner in a 2–1 home success over Deportivo Lara; aged 17 years, one month and 25 days, he became the youngest Brazilian to score in the competition and second overall, only behind Juan Carlos Cárdenas; his record was broken in the following month by teammate Ângelo.

Kaiky made his Série A debut on 29 May 2021, starting in a 0–3 away loss against Bahia. On 27 April 2022, after establishing himself in the first team squad, he renewed his contract until December 2026.

Almería
On 11 July 2022, Santos agreed to transfer Kaiky to Spanish La Liga side UD Almería for a rumoured fee of €7 million. The move was officially announced eight days later, with the player signing a six-year deal.

Kaiky made his debut abroad on 14 August 2022, starting in a 2–1 home loss to Real Madrid.

International career
Kaiky was called up to the under-15 team in 2019, and featured in the 2019 South American U-15 Championship for the side as captain. He featured in six matches during the tournament as his side lifted the trophy.

In 2020, Kaiky was called multiple times to the under-17s, in a training period ahead of the 2021 South American U-17 Championship.

Career statistics

Honours

International
Brazil U15
South American U-15 Championship: 2019

References

External links

2004 births
Living people
Sportspeople from Santos, São Paulo
Brazilian footballers
Association football defenders
Campeonato Brasileiro Série A players
La Liga players
Santos FC players
UD Almería players
Brazil youth international footballers
Brazilian expatriate footballers
Brazilian expatriate sportspeople in Spain
Expatriate footballers in Spain